Numenoides is a monotypic moth genus in the subfamily Lymantriinae. Its only species, Numenoides grandis, is found on Madagascar. Both the genus and the species were first described by Arthur Gardiner Butler in 1879.

References

Lymantriinae
Monotypic moth genera